Esthlogenopsis is a genus of longhorn beetles of the subfamily Lamiinae, containing the following species:

 Esthlogenopsis atlantica Monne & Monne, 2006
 Esthlogenopsis ochreoscutellaris Breuning, 1942

References

Pteropliini